Lenox Street Projects is a low-income housing project in the Lower Roxbury section of Boston, Massachusetts. The 376-unit three-story brick buildings were built in 1939 and was the first housing project in Boston that African American families were able to move into.  In recent years, it has become infamous for violence and gang activity.

References

Public housing in Boston
Roxbury, Boston